Bowen railway station is located on the North Coast line in Queensland, Australia. It serves the town of Bowen. The station has one platform.

Services
Bowen is served by Traveltrain's Spirit of Queensland service.

References

External links

Bowen station Queensland's Railways on the Internet

Regional railway stations in Queensland
North Coast railway line, Queensland
Bowen, Queensland